Cottus jaxartensis is a species of freshwater ray-finned fish belonging to the family Cottidae, the typical sculpins. This fish is endemic to the basin of the Syr-Darya in Uzbekistan, Kazakhstan and Kyrgyzstan. This species is classified within the nominate subgenus of the genus Cottus and it is closely related to the European bullhead (Cottus gobio) of which it was considered as subspecies. The specific name, jaxartensis, means "of the Jaxartes", the ancient name of the Syr Darya River.

References

jaxartensis
Fish described in 1916